Bradford Scobie is a New York City performance artist and comedian who performs one-man musical comedy routines.

Doctor Donut
Scobie is known for his onstage persona as the comical supervillain Doctor Donut. In this guise, Scobie wears a dirty white leotard, blackened teeth, a massive false eyebrow, and nearly identical mustache, an éclair hanging down the front of his crotch, a giant donut with the words "Doctor Donut" on his head, and fake donuts hanging all over his body.

New York media including L Magazine, The Village Voice and The New York Times covered Scobie's character.  As this character, Scobie appeared alongside other artists from Manhattan's arts scene in Shortbus, a 2006 American comedy-drama film written and directed by John Cameron Mitchell.

Other characters
Other bizarre characters created by Scobie include the clown Ukulele Louie, the "spitty and adorable man-child" Bratwurst, and Cousin Rooster, a hillbilly who has sex with chickens.  As Zombie Ralph he worked as "Master of Scare-a-Moanies" for "BOO-LESQUE WITH ZOMBIE RALPH", a Halloween-themed show at Joe's Pub in 2008.

Additional credits
Gas Huffin' Bad Gals!, a film written by and starring Scobie, was accepted into the Cannes Film Festival, the New York Underground Film Festival, the Outfest festival in Los Angeles, and was aired on BBC television in England.  Scobie is one of the founding members of the sketch comedy group Chucklebucket and played the husband in the comedy lounge act, "Vance & Lorna".

As a stand up comedian, Scobie has hosted and performed at corporate events throughout the country.

References

External links
The Doctor Donut Website, YOU FOOLS!

American male comedians
21st-century American comedians
American neo-burlesque performers
Year of birth missing (living people)
Living people